Docimodus evelynae is a species of haplochromine cichlid. It is endemic to Lake Malawi; it is widespread in the lake and found in Malawi, Mozambique, and Tanzania. This species has unusual feeding habits: it feeds upon the flank scales of cichlids or cyprinids and the skin of catfishes. The specific name honours Evelyn Axelrod, the wife of the publisher Herbert R. Axelrod (1927-2017).

References

Evelynae
Cichlid fish of Africa
Fish of Malawi
Fish of Mozambique
Fish of Tanzania
Fish described in 1976
Taxa named by David Henry Eccles
Taxa named by Digby S. C. Lewis
Taxonomy articles created by Polbot
Fish of Lake Malawi